Ludwig Puser (born 17 April 1946) is an Austrian sports shooter. He competed in the mixed trap event at the 1984 Summer Olympics.

References

1946 births
Living people
Austrian male sport shooters
Olympic shooters of Austria
Shooters at the 1984 Summer Olympics
Place of birth missing (living people)